SS (RMS) Mona (III), the third ship of the Company to bear the name, was a steel paddle-steamer which was originally owned and operated by the London, Chatham and Dover Railway Company, who then sold her to the Liverpool and Douglas Steamship Company, from whose liquidators she was acquired by the Isle of Man Steam Packet Company in 1903.

Construction and dimensions
Constructed in the yards of Faifields of Govan in 1889 she was originally named Calais Douvres. Length 324 feet 5 inches; beam 35 feet 9 inches; depth 13 feet 5 inches. She was certified to carry 1212 passengers, and had a crew complement of 59.

Her engines produced an indicated horsepower of 5,400, but the vessel's speed is open to question. No speed is entered in the Register of Shipping, but her best run during her sea trials averaged 18.86 knots. The Steam Packet give it as 18 knots, but she is said to have steamed from Dover to Calais in three minutes under the hour at an average speed of 22.6 knots.

Service life
On completion, Calais Douvres entered service with the London, Chatham and Dover Railway Company, plying between Calais and Dover - the two ports after which she was named. During her channel service she was the vessel on which Queen Victoria made her last trip to the continent of Europe.

From the London, Chatham and Dover Railway Company, she was acquired by Higginbottom's Liverpool and Douglas Steamers Ltd, and entered service on the Irish Sea in competition with the Isle of Man Steam Packet Company in 1901.

Upon the death of Mr Higginbottom in December 1902, the Liverpool and Douglas Steamship Company ceased to exist, and the vessel was then bought from the liquidators by the Isle of Man Steam Packet Company in July 1903. The consideration was £6,000; and upon her purchase she was renamed Mona.

Mona entered service for the Steam Packet Company on Thursday 23 July 1903, when under the command of Captain Hill she sailed from Liverpool to Douglas making passage in 3hrs 45mins.
She then made passage to Ramsey taking a sailing back to Liverpool. She also transported members of the Herefordshire Volunteers from Ramsey to Birkenhead on 9 August.

On Thursday 16 June 1904, a passenger on board the Mona died whilst she was en route from Liverpool to Douglas. The passenger, Henry Leyland, was a surveyor and employed by Prescott District Council. An Inquest was held at Douglas the following day, before High Bailiff, Samuel Harris. Present for the Isle of Man Steam Packet Company was Mr Corkill and evidence was given by the deceased's wife and Dr Davies of Liscard, Cheshire.
During the course of Mrs Harris' evidence, she stated that she and her 37-year-old husband had departed Liverpool on board the Mona on the 10:30hrs sailing the previous morning, at which time her husband appeared well. However, he soon became unwell and an appeal was made on board for a Doctor. 
Dr Davies attended Mr Leyland at 13:00hrs, by which time Mr Leyland was in a state of unconsciousness and expired shortly after, the result of heart failure.

Disposal
Mona was the last paddle-ship bought for the Steam Packet fleet. After six years of service with the line, Mona was sold for scrap in 1909.

Official number and code letters 
Official numbers are issued by individual flag states. They should not be confused with IMO ship identification numbers. Nona had the UK Official Number 96575 and originally used the Code Letters  L J R V .

References

Bibliography
 Chappell, Connery (1980). Island Lifeline T. Stephenson & Sons Ltd 

Ships of the Isle of Man Steam Packet Company
1889 ships
Ferries of the Isle of Man
Steamships of the United Kingdom
Paddle steamers of the United Kingdom
Ships built in Govan